Takayo Hashi (端貴代 Hashi Takayo, born October 2, 1977) is a Japanese female mixed martial artist.

Biography
Hashi observed her brother grappling and competing in mixed martial arts and this inspired her to compete as well.

She joined the Wajutsu Keishukai, Tokyo Honbu gym and worked as an office worker during the day.

Mixed martial arts career
Hashi held the title of Smackgirl Grappling Queen in the promotion's Open-Weight division.

She competed in the Japanese Abu Dhabi (ADCC) qualifiers in 2007 and won her division. On May 6 and 7 of that year, she took third place in the official ADCC Submission Wrestling World Championship in Trenton, New Jersey.

Hashi suffered her first defeat in MMA in 2005 when she was submitted by Hitomi Akano. She then won eight straight fights and avenged the loss to Akano in their 2007 rematch.

Hashi faced Amanda Buckner at FFF 4 - Call of the Wild on April 3, 2008. She won the fight by unanimous decision. She later defeated Chisa Yonezawa at Valkyrie 2 on April 25, 2009.

Hashi was set to make her Strikeforce debut against Sarah Kaufman at Strikeforce Challengers: Kaufman vs. Hashi on November 20, 2009, but the fight was later removed from the card. It was first rescheduled for January 2010, but finally took place on February 26, 2010. The fight crowned the first Strikeforce Women's Bantamweight Champion at 135 lbs. However, Hashi lost the fight by Unanimous Decision after five rounds.

Hashi faced Tara LaRosa at DaMMAge Fight League 1 on November 24, 2010 in Atlantic City, New Jersey. She was defeated by Unanimous Decision after five rounds.

Hashi challenged Cat Zingano in a women's title bout at Fight To Win: Outlaws on May 14, 2011 in Denver, Colorado. She was defeated by knockout from a slam late in the third round.

On February 10, 2012, it was announced that Hashi would face Roxanne Modafferi at Jewels 18th Ring on March 3 in Tokyo. She defeated Modafferi by unanimous decision.

Pancrase
In 2018, Hashi signed with Pancrase and after her promotional debut victory she challenged Sidy Rocha for the inaugural Pancrase Flyweight Championship but lost the fight via unanimous decision.

She then faced Mayra Cantuária at Pancrase 308 on September 29, 2019. She lost the fight via unanimous decision.

Hashi faced Raika Emiko at Pancrase 316 on July 24, 2020. She won the fight via unanimous decision.

She faced Nori Date for the interim Flyweight Queen of Pancrase title at Pancrase 324 on October 17, 2021. She won the bout and the title via unanimous decision.

Mixed martial arts record

|-
| Win
| align=center| 18–8–1
| Nori Date
| Decision (unanimous)
| Pancrase 324
| 
| align=center| 5
| align=center| 5:00
| Tokyo, Japan
| 
|-
| Win
| align=center| 17–8–1
| Raika Emiko
| Decision (unanimous)
| Pancrase 316
| 
| align=center| 3
| align=center| 5:00
| Tokyo, Japan
| 
|-
| Loss
| align=center| 16–8–1
| Mayra Cantuária
| Decision (unanimous)
| Pancrase 308
| 
| align=center| 3
| align=center| 5:00
| Tokyo, Japan
| 
|-
| Loss
| align=center| 16–7–1
| Sidy Rocha
| Decision (unanimous)
| Pancrase 304
| 
| align=center| 5
| align=center| 5:00
| Tokyo, Japan
| For the Pancrase inaugural Flyweight Championship.
|-
| Win
| align=center| 16–6–1
| Barbara Acioly
| Submission (rear-naked choke)
| Pancrase 293
| 
| align=center| 2
| align=center| 3:20
| Tokyo, Japan
| 
|-
| Loss
| align=center| 15–6–1
| Ji Yeon Kim
| Decision (unanimous)
|  Deep Jewels 9
| 
| align=center| 3
| align=center| 5:00
| Tokyo, Japan
| Lost the Deep Jewels Bantamweight Championship
|-
| Loss
| align=center| 15–5–1
| Barb Honchak
| Decision (unanimous)
| Invicta FC 9: Honchak vs. Hashi
| 
| align=center| 5
| align=center| 5:00
| Davenport, Iowa
| For the Invicta FC Flyweight Championship
|-
| Win
| align=center| 15–4–1
| Shizuka Sugiyama
| TKO (punches)
|  Deep Jewels 4
| 
| align=center| 3
| align=center| 4:20
| Tokyo, Japan
| Won the Deep Jewels inaugural Middleweight (135 lbs) Championship
|-
| Draw
| align=center| 14–4–1
| Ji Yeon Kim
| Draw (unanimous)
| Road FC Korea 002: Korea vs. Japan
| 
| align=center| 2
| align=center| 5:00
| Seoul, South Korea
|
|-
| Win
| align=center| 14–4
| Roxanne Modafferi
| Decision (unanimous)
| Jewels 18th Ring
| 
| align=center| 2
| align=center| 5:00
| Koto, Tokyo, Japan
|
|-
| Loss
| align=center| 13–4
| Cat Zingano
| KO (slam)
| Fight To Win: "Outlaws"
| 
| align=center| 3
| align=center| 4:42
| Denver, Colorado, United States
| For Fight To Win Women's Championship
|-
| Loss
| align=center| 13–3
| Tara LaRosa
| Decision (unanimous)
| DaMMAge Fight League - The Big Bang
| 
| align=center| 5
| align=center| 5:00
| Atlantic City, New Jersey, United States
| For DaMMAge Fight League Women's 125 lbs Championship
|-
| Loss
| align=center| 13–2
| Sarah Kaufman
| Decision (unanimous)
| Strikeforce Challengers: Kaufman vs. Hashi
| 
| align=center| 5
| align=center| 5:00
| San Jose, California, United States
| 
|-
| Win
| align=center| 13–1
| Chisa Yonezawa
| Submission (rear-naked choke)
| GCM - Valkyrie 2
| 
| align=center| 2
| align=center| 1:43
| Tokyo, Japan
|
|-
| Win
| align=center| 12–1
| Amanda Buckner
| Decision (unanimous)
| FFF 4: "Call of the Wild"
| 
| align=center| 3
| align=center| 5:00
| Los Angeles, California, United States
|
|-
| Win
| align=center| 11–1
| Hitomi Akano
| Decision (unanimous)
| Smackgirl - Queens' Hottest Summer
| 
| align=center| 3
| align=center| 5:00
| Tokyo, Japan
| Won Smackgirl Middleweight Championship
|-
| Win
| align=center| 10–1
| Hee Jin Lee
| Decision (unanimous)
| Deep: CMA Festival 2
| 
| align=center| 2
| align=center| 5:00
| Tokyo, Japan
|
|-
| Win
| align=center| 9–1
| Sybil Starr
| Submission (armbar)
| Smackgirl - Will The Queen Paint The Shinjuku Skies Red?
| 
| align=center| 1
| align=center| 2:47
| Tokyo, Japan
|
|-
| Win
| align=center| 8–1
| Miki Morifuji
| Decision (unanimous)
| Smackgirl - Legend of Extreme Women
| 
| align=center| 2
| align=center| 5:00
| Tokyo, Japan
|
|-
| Win
| align=center| 7–1
| Kinuka Sasaki
| Submission (rear-naked choke)
| Smackgirl - Top Girl Battle
| 
| align=center| 1
| align=center| 2:31
| Tokyo, Japan
|
|-
| Win
| align=center| 6–1
| Kazuma Morohoshi
| Decision (unanimous)
| Smackgirl - Advent of Goddess
| 
| align=center| 2
| align=center| 5:00
| Tokyo, Japan
|
|-
| Loss
| align=center| 5–1
| Hitomi Akano
| Submission (armbar)
| Smackgirl - Dynamic!!
| 
| align=center| 1
| align=center| 1:19
| Tokyo, Japan
|
|-
| Win
| align=center| 5–0
| Yukari
| Decision (unanimous)
| Smackgirl - The Next Cinderella 2005 Second Stage
| 
| align=center| 2
| align=center| 5:00
| Tokyo, Japan
|
|-
| Win
| align=center| 4–0
| Yoko Hattori
| Decision (unanimous)
| Smackgirl - The Next Cinderella 2005 First Stage
| 
| align=center| 2
| align=center| 5:00
| Tokyo, Japan
|
|-
| Win
| align=center| 3–0
| Yumiko Sugimoto
| Decision (unanimous)
| GCM - Cross Section 3
| 
| align=center| 2
| align=center| 5:00
| Tokyo, Japan
|
|-
| Win
| align=center| 2–0
| Mika Harigai
| Submission (rear-naked choke)
| Smackgirl - Yuuki Kondo Retirement Celebration
| 
| align=center| 2
| align=center| 4:28
| Tokyo, Japan
|
|-
| Win
| align=center| 1–0
| Natsuko Kikukawa
| Decision (unanimous)
| GCM - Cross Section 2
| 
| align=center| 2
| align=center| 5:00
| Tokyo, Japan
|

Championships
 Deep Jewels Bantamweight Champion (one time)
 Final Smackgirl Middleweight Champion

See also
 List of current mixed martial arts champions
 List of female mixed martial artists

References

External links
 Takayo Hashi Awakening Profile
 

1977 births
Living people
Japanese female mixed martial artists
People from Sumida
People from Tokyo
People from Tokyo Metropolis
Sportspeople from Tokyo
Sportspeople from Tokyo Metropolis
Wajitsu Keishukai
Bantamweight mixed martial artists
20th-century Japanese women
21st-century Japanese women